The men's shot put was one of six throwing events on the Athletics at the 1908 Summer Olympics programme in London. The competition was held on July 16, 1908. 25 shot putters from eight nations competed. NOCs could enter up to 12 athletes. The event was won by Ralph Rose, successfully defending his title from 1904 and making it four consecutive Games that the event was won by an American. The two-Games streak of sweeps in 1900 and 1904 ended, however, as Denis Horgan of Great Britain took silver. Johnny Garrels of the United States took bronze. Rose was the second man to win two medals in the shot put (and the first to win two golds); Wesley Coe nearly was the third as he ended up in 4th place, only 11 centimetres behind Garrels.

Background

This was the fourth appearance of the event, which is one of 12 athletics events to have been held at every Summer Olympics. Three Americans returned from the 1904 Games: gold medalist Ralph Rose, silver medalist Wesley Coe, and fourth-place finisher Martin Sheridan. Sheridan was best at the discus, but had won the shot put at the 1906 Intercalated Games (and was also an accomplished standing jumper). Irishman Denis Horgan, one of the best shot putters in the world over the past decade and a half, finally competed in the Olympics after not participating in prior Games. Horgan was 37 years old; still a strong contender (he would continue winning AAA championships until 1912), but unable to compete with Rose in his 23-year-old prime.

Finland, France, Great Britain, and Norway made their debut in the men's shot put. Greece and the United States each appeared for the fourth time, having competed in all Olympic shot put competitions to date.

Competition format

The competition returned to the two-round format of 1900, with results carrying over between rounds. Each athlete received three throws in the qualifying round. The top three men advanced to the final, where they received an additional three throws. The best result, qualifying or final, counted. The throw itself was largely under modern rules (16 pound weight, 7 foot circle), but no toe board was used.

Records

These were the standing world and Olympic records (in metres) prior to the 1908 Summer Olympics.

* unofficial

No new world or Olympic records were set during the competition.

Schedule

Results

Distances and placement are known only for the top eight. Sequences are not known.

References

Sources
 Official Report of the Games of the IV Olympiad (1908).
 De Wael, Herman. Herman's Full Olympians: "Athletics 1908". Accessed 7 April 2006.

Athletics at the 1908 Summer Olympics
Shot put at the Olympics